The Hintere Schöntaufspitze is a mountain in the Ortler Alps in South Tyrol, Italy.

References 
 Peter Holl: Alpenvereinsführer Ortleralpen. Bergverlag Rudolf Rother, München 1990. 

Mountains of the Alps
Mountains of South Tyrol
Alpine three-thousanders
Ortler Alps